Adam Stegerwald (14 December 1874, in Greußenheim, Lower Franconia – 3 December 1945) was a German Catholic politician and a leader of the left wing of the Centre Party.

Under the Empire
Stegerwald was born the son of a farmer. He attended primary school in Greußenheim between 1881-1888. He then learned the profession of carpenter in Würzburg. In 1893, he entered the Catholic Gesellenverein in Günzburg (Swabia).
 
From 1900 to 1902, he was a private listener of Lujo Brentano for two semesters for economics and special economics at the Ludwig Maximilian University of Munich. Between 1903-1905, he attended lectures at the Graduate School of Cologne. Between 1916-1919, he was a member of the board of the Reichsernähungsamt. He belonged to the Prussian House of Lords between 1917-1918.

During the Weimar Republic
As a representative of the Christian trade unions, he signed on 15 November 1918 the "Arbeitsgemeinschaftsabkommen" between the employer's association and the trade unions. From 1919-29 he became the head of the Christian German Union Federation (DGB). He was from 1919 to 1920 a member of the National Assembly. He belonged to the 'Committee for the preliminary discussion of the draft constitution for the German Empire' of the National Assembly. From March 1919 to November 1921, he was Prussian Minister for People's Welfare. From April to November 1921 he held both the office of the Prussian Minister-president, from April 1929 to March 1930 that of the Minister for Transports, from March 1930 to May 1932, the Minister for employment.

As Minister of Labour in the cabinet of his former personal assistant Heinrich Brüning he tried to save at least the basics of the Weimar welfare state under the conditions of the Great Depression. He failed therein because of the resistance of the Heavy industry.

Nazi Regime
Following Hitler's appointment as Chancellor, Stegerwald was attacked by Nazi storm troopers at an election rally in Krefeld on February 21, 1933, while regular police did not interfere

In March 1933, he led together with Ludwig Kaas and Albert Hackelsberger negotiations with Adolf Hitler. Afterwards the Centre party agreed to the Enabling Act.

From 1933-34 he was indicted, along with Wilhelm Marx and Heinrich Brauns, in the trial of the Cologne Volksverein Verlag in his capacity as board member of the National Association for Catholic Germany. He was on the list of politicians to be purged during the Night of the Long Knives, but was warned about this and disappeared into exile for three months.

After the 20 July plot, he was temporarily arrested under the Aktion Gitter. From August 24, October 19, 1944 he was detained by the Gestapo in Würzburg prison. During the time of Nazi Germany he had no influence.

After the war
In 1945, he was appointed at the behest of the American occupation forces for District President of the district of Lower Franconia. Stegerwald became the leading head of the Würzburg group that was instrumental in the founding of the Christian Social Union in Bavaria in the summer and autumn of 1945, in addition to the Munich group around Josef Müller.

Adam Stegerwald died in December 1945 from pneumonia, eleven days before his 71st birthday.

References

Literature
 Schnorr, Helmut J.: Adam Stegerwald, Gewerkschafter, Politiker der ersten deutschen Republik. Ein Beitrag zur Geschichte der christlich-sozialen Bewegung in Deutschland. 1966.
 Morsey, Rudolf: Zeitgeschichte in Lebensbildern – Aus dem deutschen Katholizismus des 20. Jahrhunderts. Band 1. 1973, S. 216.
 Rosenberg, Ludwig, Tacke, Bernhard: Der Weg zur Einheits-Gewerkschaft. Hrsg. DGB-Bundesvorstand. Druck: satz + druck, Düsseldorf 1977.
 Forster, Bernhard: Adam Stegerwald (1874–1945). Christlich-nationaler Gewerkschafter, Zentrumspolitiker, Mitbegründer der Unionsparteien. Droste Verlag, Düsseldorf 2003, . (scientific biography)

External links
 

1874 births
1945 deaths
People from Würzburg (district)
People from the Kingdom of Bavaria
German Roman Catholics
Centre Party (Germany) politicians
Christian Social Union in Bavaria politicians
Government ministers of Germany
Labor ministers (Germany)
Members of the Weimar National Assembly
Members of the Reichstag of the Weimar Republic
Members of the Prussian House of Lords
Prime Ministers of Prussia
Articles lacking sources from June 2009
All articles lacking sources